Rhodopidae is a taxonomic family of sea snails, marine opisthobranch gastropod mollusks in the superfamily Murchisonelloidea.

Genera
Genera include:
 Helminthope Salvini-Plawen, 1991
 Rhodope Koelliker, 1847
Genera brought into synonymy
 Sidonia Schulze, 1854: synonym of Rhodope Koelliker, 1847

Taxonomy
Molecular work has shown that this family is a basal clade of heterobranch Mollusca. Anatomically aberrant, Rhodopidae have been shown to be related to snails of the family Murchisonellidae which all have a narrow shell with many whorls.

References

Further reading
 Haszprunar, G. and G. Huber. (1990). On the central nervous system of Smeagolidae and Rhodopidae, two families questionably allied to the Gymnomorpha (Gastropoda, Euthyneura). Journal of Zoology 220: 185-199.

External links